Management by observation has two unrelated meanings:

 Managing diseases by observing the progress of patient over a period of time to determine if the observed would benefit from intervention.
 Management of employees by observing that they are present at the physical work place during accepted working hours and appear to be doing expected work tasks. Without objective setting may lead to presenteeism.

See also
 Flextime
 Flexplace
 Management by objectives

References

 Research article of cancer treatment.
 Presenteeism from WebMD
 Myths about telecommuting.

Human resource management